Leam West Bog is a national nature reserve of approximately  in County Galway. It is managed by the Irish National Parks & Wildlife Service.

Features
Leam West Bog was legally protected as a national nature reserve by the Irish government in 1991.

As a diverse blanket bog, it has been deemed of international importance due to the diversity it holds in both acidic and alkaline habitats due to the varying geology on the site. Among the habitats found on the reserve are bog pools, rock outcrops, wet quaking areas, streams and flushes. It is the largest areas of intact bog in Connemara, with both low and highland bog.

References

Bogs of the Republic of Ireland
Landforms of County Galway
Protected areas of County Galway
Tourist attractions in County Galway
Nature reserves in the Republic of Ireland
Protected areas established in 1991
1991 establishments in Ireland